M/V Aranui 5 is a dual passenger/cargo vessel that entered service 12 December 2015 between Tahiti and the Marquesas Islands. With a homeport of Papeete, French Polynesia, the Aranui 5 replaced the Aranui 3 which entered service in 2003. The Aranui 5, like its predecessor, is registered as a passenger ship under the International Convention for the Safety of Life at Sea (SOLAS), for international operation.

Apart from supplying cargo to the six ports in the Marquesas Islands, Aranui 5 also operates a passenger service and tourist cruise as part of its 14-day itinerary. It also stops at the islands of Rangiroa and Fakarava in the Tuamotu Islands before returning on its 13th day to Bora Bora in the Society Islands.

References

External links 
Aranui The Official Site

Expedition cruising
2015 ships
Cruise ships
Marquesas Islands
Bora Bora
Tahiti